Neil Cooper (born 2 April 1971) is an English musician best known as the current drummer of Therapy?, a rock band from Northern Ireland, and formerly of The Beyond, a rock band from England.

Career
Cooper was a founding member of The Beyond in 1988. The band signed with EMI Records and released two albums, entitled Crawl and Chasm, the latter being recorded in New York City with Jim Thirlwell. The band toured throughout the UK, Europe and US with Therapy?, Red Hot Chili Peppers, Soundgarden, Claytown Troupe and Living Colour.

The Beyond disbanded in 1993, after which Cooper joined Cable. The band signed to Infectious Records and Cooper appeared on their debut album Downlift the Uptrodden. He also played on both of their John Peel sessions and toured the UK and Europe with Ash, Girls Against Boys, Boss Hog and Oasis.

In 1995, however, Cooper re-joined his old bandmates from The Beyond in a new group called Gorilla. In 1998, following the release of several EPs, the group disbanded.

Cooper, by now operating freelance, had a stint with bigbeat combo Psychedeliasmith, and worked with Fatboy Slim. Cooper also gained his Certificate in Teaching from the Royal Schools of Music in 2001, the same year as he co-founded a Derby-based record label called Stressed Sumo Records.

Cooper joined Therapy? in 2002, following the departure of Graham Hopkins. His first live performance with Therapy? took place at the Carvicais Rock Festival in Portugal on 10 August that year. It followed one rehearsal in which he had to learn the full sixteen song set. Cooper has since played on the band's last seven studio albums – High Anxiety, Never Apologise Never Explain, One Cure Fits All, Crooked Timber, A Brief Crack of Light, Disquiet and Cleave.

Drum lessons
Whenever he is not touring or otherwise busy with Therapy?, Cooper provides drum lessons. He teaches at Queen Elizabeth's Grammar School (QEGS), Ashbourne, Derbyshire.

Cooper uses, and is endorsed by, Mapex drums. He also uses Paiste cymbals.

Discography

The Beyond
 Manic Sound Panic (1990 EP)
 No Excuse (1990 EP)
 Crawl (1991 album)
 "One Step Too Far" (1991 single)
 "Empire" (1991 single)
 Raging (1991 EP)
 Chasm (1993 album)

Cable
 "Sale of the Century" (1994 single)
 "Seventy" (1995 single)
 "Blindman" (1995 single)
 "Seventy" (1996 single)
 Downlift the Uptrodden (1996 album)

Gorilla
 Extended Play (1995 EP)
 Shutdown (1995 EP)
 "Who Wants to Save the World Anyway?" (1997 single)
 "Outside" (1998 single)

Therapy?

 All releases from 2003 to present

References

External links
 Therapy? website
 Sublingual interview
 BBC Derby article
 Stressed Sumo Records - The label Neil co-runs

Therapy? members
English heavy metal drummers
1973 births
Living people
Musicians from Derby
21st-century drummers